William Monroe Ewing (January 31, 1903 – September 1, 1979), nicknamed "Buck", was an American Negro league catcher between 1920 and 1930.

A native of Massillon, Ohio, Ewing made his Negro leagues debut in 1920 with the Chicago American Giants. He went on to play for the Columbus Buckeyes and Cleveland Tate Stars, and finished his career with a three-year stint with the Homestead Grays from 1928 to 1930. Ewing died in Schenectady, New York in 1979 at age 76.

References

External links
 and Baseball-Reference Black Baseball stats and Seamheads

1903 births
1979 deaths
Chicago American Giants players
Cleveland Tate Stars players
Columbus Buckeyes (Negro leagues) players
Homestead Grays players
Baseball catchers
Baseball players from Ohio
Sportspeople from Massillon, Ohio
20th-century African-American sportspeople